Shalimar "Chaly" Elvin Valerio Jones (born 29 January 1977 in Willemstad, Curaçao in the former Netherlands Antilles) is a footballer who currently plays for FC Oss in the Dutch third division.

Career
A much travelled midfielder, Jones played in the Netherlands, Norway, Portugal and Greece.

International career
Jones made his debut for the Netherlands Antilles in a March 2004 World Cup qualifying match against Antigua & Barbuda.

References

External links 

1977 births
Living people
People from Willemstad
Curaçao footballers
Dutch Antillean footballers
Netherlands Antilles international footballers
Association football midfielders
Eerste Divisie players
Excelsior Rotterdam players
Feyenoord players
FC Den Bosch players
TOP Oss players
Fortuna Sittard players
Xanthi F.C. players
C.F. União players
Expatriate footballers in Greece